With a contingent of 4,350 soldiers and policemen, Germany was one of the main contributors of troops to coalition operations in Afghanistan. Although German troops mainly operated in the comparatively quiet north of the country, the Bundeswehr suffered a number of casualties during participation in the International Security Assistance Force mission in Afghanistan.

Overview
Among them are the first German reservists to fall in hostile actions and the first German policemen to die in deployment abroad since World War II. In addition to these fatalities, 245 German soldiers and 4 police officers suffered injuries of varying degrees caused by hostile activity.

Controversy
The number of fatalities has caused a stir in Germany since it is the highest of all deployments abroad that the German army has participated in since World War II and because German participation in the conflict is controversial. ISAF participation marks the first time since World War II that German ground troops have been confronted with an organized enemy. Prior to 2002, the Armed Forces had sustained only two losses of life connected to direct hostile activities: a soldier with UN troops in Cambodia was shot dead in 1993 and a medical officer died when the helicopter he was traveling in was shot down by Georgian insurgents in 2003.

As a direct result of the number of deaths, German Federal Minister of Defence, Franz Josef Jung, presented plans to establish a central memorial for fallen soldiers in Berlin on June 17, 2007. Furthermore, the Bundeswehr has unveiled a new order which is to honour acts of heroism achieved in deployments abroad: the Cross of Honour for Bravery.

An incident that occurred on June 26, 2005 which was at first declared an accident by the Cabinet of Germany turned out to have been an attack with a remote-controlled device.

The cause of death of a soldier who died on September 8, 2007 at an unknown location in Afghanistan has not yet been disclosed. It appears to be a result of suicide.

The cause of death of two soldiers who died in the first half of 2003 has yet to be disclosed. As no official sources specify the circumstances of their deaths, they are very likely not connected to hostile action.

In a statement published on February 2, 2008, Herr Jung mentioned a number of 26 German soldiers who had been killed in Afghanistan.

In a 2010 interview, Special Forces Command (KSK) commander Hans-Christoph Ammon said that no KSK soldiers had so far been killed in action. However, a press release from the US European Command confirmed that at least one soldier was wounded in action in Afghanistan sometime between June and October 2005.

Chronology of incidents

2002

2003

2004

2005

2006

2007

2008

2009

2010

2011

2012

2013

2015

2018

2019

See also
Operation Karez

References

 
War in Afghanistan (2001–2021)-related lists
Afghanistan
German Armed Forces